Baruajani is a village in Kamrup rural district, in the state of Assam, India, situated in north bank of river Brahmaputra.

Transport
The village is near National Highway 27 and connected to nearby towns and cities like Puthimari, Kamalpur, Baihata and Guwahati with regular buses and other modes of transportation.

See also
 Barpalaha
 Batarhat

References

Villages in Kamrup district